Teniski klub Crvena zvezda is a tennis club from Belgrade, Serbia. The club is part of the SD Crvena Zvezda. The club was founded as a section of Red Star on 22 April 1946.

Honours and achievements

Men
National Championships
Winners (25): 1974, 1975, 1978, 1979, 1982, 1983, 1984, 1998, 1999, 2000, 2002, 2004, 2006, 2008, 2009, 2010, 2011, 2012, 2013, 2014, 2015, 2016, 2017, 2018, 2022
European Champions Cup
Quarter-finalists (4): 1979, 1985, 2000, 2001

Women
National Championships
Winners (14): 1998, 1999, 2001, 2002, 2003, 2004, 2005, 2006, 2007, 2008, 2011, 2014, 2015, 2018

Notable players

Men
  Slobodan Živojinović
  Dragan Savić
  Zoltan Ilin
  Aleksandar Kitinov
  Nebojša Đorđević
  Dejan Petrović
  Alex Vlaški
  Milen Velev
  Ivaylo Traykov
  Jimy Szymanski
  Nenad Zimonjić
  Viktor Troicki
  Boris Pašanski
  Ilija Bozoljac
  Nikola Ćirić
  David Savić
  Miljan Zekić
  Danilo Petrović
  Nikola Milojević

Women
  Dragana Zarić
  Katarina Mišić
  Jelena Janković
  Aleksandra Krunić
  Ana Timotić
  Ana Jovanović
  Danica Krstajić

External links
Official website 
O klubu – Moja Crvena Zvezda 

Crvena zvezda
Sport in Belgrade